Liu Zhijian (1912 – March 11, 2006) was a People's Liberation Army lieutenant general. He was born in Pingjiang County, Hunan Province. He joined the Communist Party of China in 1931. He was a member of the Eighth Route Army during the Second Sino-Japanese War. He was captured in southern Hebei by Japanese forces, but later rescued. During the Chinese Civil War, he was active in the region of Shanxi, Hebei, Shandong and Henan Provinces. During the Cultural Revolution, he opposed Jiang Qing. He was later sent by Deng Xiaoping to Kunming for planning the Sino-Vietnamese War along with Yang Dezhi.

1912 births
2006 deaths
People's Liberation Army generals from Hunan
Members of the 12th Central Committee of the Chinese Communist Party
Political commissars of the Kunming Military Region
Deputy chiefs of the People's Liberation Army General Political Department
People from Pingjiang County
Members of the Central Advisory Commission